The Hyundai Theta is a gasoline four-cylinder automobile engine family. The third all-aluminum engine of Hyundai Motor Company debuted in the fourth-generation Hyundai Sonata sedan (codenamed NF), which was unveiled in August 2004 in South Korea. Hyundai Motor Manufacturing Alabama (HMMA) built a Theta II engine shop on the grounds of their Montgomery, Alabama automobile factory.

Global Engine Alliance

The Global Engine Alliance was a joint venture between Chrysler, Mitsubishi Motors, and the Hyundai Motor Company for developing a line of shared four-cylinder engines. The initial design of the engine block and cylinder head was handled by Hyundai. However, each manufacturer configured their variants of the initial design differently based on their needs. In 2009, Chrysler bought out Mitsubishi and Hyundai's stake in the joint-venture; however, each company retained rights to build the engines.

Technical details

Theta
The engine features hollow stainless-steel dual overhead camshafts (DOHC) with powder-metal cam lobes, pent-roof combustion chambers and shimless bucket tappets in the cylinder head. BorgWarner Morse TEC supplies the complete timing system which uses the company's proprietary silent timing chains. Continuously variable valve timing (CVVT) works on the intake side.

The aluminum alloy engine block, which is formed using a high-pressure die-cast method, has a unique Metaldyne-supplied cassette-type balance shaft module with a two-stage oil pump built-in. In the lower-end, the block is reinforced by a ladder frame. Other notable features include fracture-split sinter-forged connecting rods manufactured by Sinteron and a stainless-steel exhaust manifold.

Theta's EMS (engine management system) software is EMS-II from Siemens VDO and the 32-bit PCM (Powertrain Control Module) calculates the amount of intake air by utilizing a contamination-proof hot-film type MAF (mass air flow) sensor.

The first version of the Theta Engine had three variants, 1.8L, 2.0L and 2.4L.

1.8L (G4KB)  

Applications
 Kia Optima (MG) (2005–2008)

2.0L (G4KA)  

Applications
 Hyundai Sonata (NF) (2004–2007)
 Kia Carens/Rondo (UN) (2006–2013)
 Kia Optima (MG) (2005–2007)

2.4L (G4KC)  

Applications
 Hyundai Grandeur (TG) (2005–2008)
 Hyundai Sonata (NF) (2004–2007)
 Kia Optima (MG) (2005–2008)
 Kia Rondo (2007–2008)

Theta II

The second generation Theta engine added CVVT on the exhaust side as well as a two-way VIS and comes in two sizes, the 2.0L and 2.4L.

2.0L MPI (G4KD)  

Applications
 Hyundai Tucson/ix35 (LM) (2009–2015)
 Hyundai Sonata (2007–2014)
 Kia Forte (TD) (2008–2012)
 Kia Optima/K5 (2008–2012)
 Kia Sportage (SL) (2010–2013)

2.4L MPI (G4KE)  

Applications
 Hyundai Azera (HG) (2013–2016)
 Hyundai Grandeur (TG) (2008–2011)
 Hyundai Santa Fe (2010–2020)
 Hyundai Sonata (2007–2019)
 Hyundai Tucson (2010–2020)
 Kia Cadenza (2009–2019)
 Kia Forte (TD) (2008–2012)
 Kia Optima (2008–2019)
 Kia Rondo (2008–2013)
 Kia Sportage (2011–2021)
 Kia Sorento (2009–2020)

2.4L FR MPI (G4KG)  

Applications
 Hyundai Starex (TQ) (2007–2021)

2.4L GDI (G4KJ)  
The Theta II GDi was announced in November 2009 starting with the 6th generation Sonata, improvements include switching to GDI.

Applications
 Hyundai Grandeur/Azera (2011–2019)
 Hyundai Santa Fe (2012–2020)
 Hyundai Sonata (2009–2019)
 Hyundai Tucson (TL) (2015–2020)
 Kia Cadenza (2011–2019)
 Kia KX7 (2016–2021)
 Kia Optima (2010–2019)
 Kia Sportage (2010–2021)
 Kia Sorento (UM) (2014–2020)

Theta II Turbo

2.0L FR Turbo MPI (G4KF)  
The turbo used is a Mitsubishi TD04 model, the block used is very similar to the 4B11T engine found in Mitsubishi Lancer Evolution X, as core components like pistons and rods are said to move freely between them, however, the two engines are not identical. The 4B11T is a semi-closed deck block with larger oil and coolant passages, where as the Theta is an open deck block.

Applications
 Hyundai Genesis Coupe (2009–2014)

2.0L Turbo GDI (G4KH)  

Applications
 Hyundai Elantra N (2021–present)
 Hyundai i30 N (2018–present)
 Hyundai Kona N (2021–present)
 Hyundai Santa Fe (2012–2020)
 Hyundai Sonata (2009–2019)
 Hyundai Veloster N (2018–present)
 Kia KX7 (2016–2021)
 Kia Optima (2011–2019)
 Kia Sorento (UM) (2015–2020)
 Kia Sportage (2011–2021)

2.0L FR Turbo GDI (G4KL)  

Applications
 Genesis G70 (2017–present)
 Genesis G80 (DH) (2017–2020)
 Kia Stinger (2017–present)

Theta II HEV

2.4L (G4KK)  

Applications
 Hyundai Grandeur/Azera Hybrid (2013–present)
 Kia Cadenza/K7 Hybrid (2013–2021)

Theta LPG

2.0L (L4KA)  

Applications
 Hyundai Sonata (2004–2011)
 Kia Carens (UN) (2006–2013)
 Kia Lotze (2005–2010)
 Kia K5 (2010–2011)

2.4L (L4KB)  

Applications
 Hyundai Starex (2008–2021)

Engine recall
Hyundai and Kia vehicles equipped with Theta II engines (gdi) were recalled, due to the fact that those engines were, and continue to be, the subject of an investigation by the National Highway Traffic Safety Administration (NHTSA). Safety regulators are investigating if Hyundai and Kia did enough in a timely manner with regards to the recalls of nearly 1.7 million vehicles with Theta engines, which were prone to an abnormal amount of noise and seizing.

In September 2015, Hyundai recalled about 470,000 model year 2011-2012 Sonatas equipped with 2-liter and 2.4-liter Theta II engines. At the time, Hyundai told NHTSA that manufacturing problems left metallic debris around the engine crankshaft, causing problems with oil flow. The pieces of metal interfere with the oil flow through the connecting rod bearings and damage the connecting rods. The automaker blamed the problem on a mechanical "deburring" process used to remove metallic machining debris from the crankshaft.

By April 2017, Hyundai expanded the 2015 recall by including another 572,000 vehicles with Theta II engines, including 2013-2014 Hyundai Sonata and Santa Fe Sport vehicles. Hyundai told safety regulators the same metal debris problem caused the expanded recall. Near that same time, Kia told NHTSA about a recall of more than 618,000 model year 2011-2014 Kia Optima, 2012-2014 Sorento and 2011-2013 Sportage vehicles because the Theta engine bearings wore out too early and caused the engines to seize.  Kia said it didn't recall the vehicles in 2015 when Hyundai first recalled its cars because the Theta II engines in the Kia vehicles were built on a different production line and had different problems than Hyundai. In addition to customers complaining about the Theta II engines, a Korean whistleblower who worked for Hyundai as an engineer let NHTSA know what he knew.

Also in April 2017, Hyundai and Kia Motors planned to recall 170,000 vehicles in South Korea from five models, including their Grandeur and Sonata, after acknowledging a defect in the Theta 2 engines used in them. Eventually, 520,000 vehicles were recalled in South Korea. 

Owners started suing after the automaker refused to pay the thousands of dollars to repair or replace the engines, with one lawsuit from 2015 alleging a dealer wanted $4,500 to do the work.  Kia was also served papers over a class-action lawsuit in 2016 filed by owners of vehicles equipped with Theta engines. NHTSA says it took action to "investigate both the timeliness and scope of Hyundai's Theta II engine recalls, and Hyundai's compliance with reporting requirements."

In Canada in 2019 Hyundai announced a recall for most vehicles using the affected engines, however a class action lawsuit was filed in 2018 as a result of failures of this engine used in Canadian Forte models and lack of manufacturer support against Kia Canada Inc.

On December 1, 2020, Hyundai and Kia recalled 423,000 vehicles equipped with various engines following a joint review by Hyundai and the NHTSA, of which the 2.4L Theta II MPI engines were a part of. This marks the first instance of the MPI variants of these engines being recalled. Affected vehicles include the 2011-2013 Hyundai Sonata Hybrid, 2012 Hyundai Santa Fe, 2012-2013 Kia Sorento, 2011-2013 Kia Optima Hybrid, 2012-2013 Kia Forte and Forte Koup, and the 2012 Kia Sportage 2.4l.

Crate engines
On 2013-11-05, Hyundai announced the creation of a new factory crate engine program at the 2013 SEMA Show in Las Vegas, which initially included a 2.0-liter, turbocharged four-cylinder engine. The crate engine program began in December 2013.

See also
 Chrysler World engine – Chrysler's GEMA built engines
 Mitsubishi 4B1 engine – Mitsubishi's GEMA built engines
 List of Hyundai engines

References

External links

Hyundai Motor Korea -- V6 3.0 Lambda Engine for 5G Grandeur – Korean link

Theta
Straight-four engines
Gasoline engines by model